The American International School of Kuwait is a private school located in Maidan Hawalli, Kuwait, offering education from grades K to 12. The school has been a member of IBO since 1993. The school's curriculum is based mostly on the US curriculum, however religion and Arabic classes are provided due to the Ministry of Education's requirement. The school has a review in the Good Schools Guide International, which states, "The school has a relaxed yet purposeful air to it throughout," adding, "Given that a majority of the students do not speak English as a first language, they do reasonably well."

History and programs
The American International School of Kuwait was founded by Dr. Kamil Al-Rayyes, on September 4, 1991. It first opened in Surra, but in 1995, it moved to its current location in Salmiya, block 11, known as Maidan Hawalli. During the summer of 2004, AIS officially became an MYP school. The MYP system is for grades 5-10. After becoming an MYP school, many changes started to form.  In 2005, AIS became an authorized Primary Years Programme (PYP) school. The school is fully accredited by the Middle States Association of Colleges and Schools. The school is also a member of the Near East South Asia Council of Overseas Schools (NESA).

The American International School of Kuwait has been an International Baccalaureate World School since September 1993. It offers the IB Primary Years Programme, IB Middle Years Programme and IB Diploma Programme (DP). Currently, AIS educates 2200 students.

The school is the only fully authorized (kindergarten through grade 12) IBO World School in Kuwait (the only other school in Kuwait offering any type of International Baccalaureate is the American Creativity Academy; however, they only offer it at high school level). There are several thousand schools worldwide that offer the IB Diploma, but fewer than 200 offer the IB programmes from kindergarten through high school. AIS Kuwait has been authorized by the IBO to offer the Middle Years Programme since 2004 and the Primary Years Programme since 2005. Currently, the Middle Years Programme is grades 5 to 10. Primary Years Program is grades KG to 4.

Recent growth has encouraged the American International School of Kuwait to expands its program. The high school expanded course offerings to appeal to diverse student interests. Growth in the elementary school encouraged the development of an Early Years school division which specializes in serving the needs of young learners. 

As of the 2022-23 school year, Dana Shuhaibar is the first Kuwaiti to become a head of a private school in Kuwait. Shuhaibar is a graduate of the American International School of Kuwait, served as a teacher and as assistant principal of the elementary school before her appointment as principal of the middle school.

The American International School of Kuwait is a university preparatory school which offers challenging and rigorous learning experiences. The school follows a student inquiry learning method which emphasizes investigations and projects.

References

External links
 Official website
International education
 U.S. Department of State Office of Overseas Schools Directory of Schools
 Review from the Good Schools Guide International
 AISK at IBO.org (International Baccalaureate Organisation)

1991 establishments in Kuwait
Educational institutions established in 1991
International Baccalaureate schools in Kuwait
American international schools in Kuwait
Private schools in Kuwait